Mario Dimitrov (born 25 October 1994, in Pernik) is a Bulgarian footballer who plays as a defender for FC Bansko.

Club career
On 9 August 2016, Dimitrov joined Bansko as free agent after his contract with Spartak Pleven has expired.  He was released in December.

References

External links

1994 births
Living people
Bulgarian footballers
First Professional Football League (Bulgaria) players
Expatriate footballers in Germany
PFC Minyor Pernik players
PFC Spartak Pleven players
FC Bansko players
FC Pirin Razlog players
Association football defenders
Sportspeople from Pernik